W. Ross Trimble (1908 – March 24, 1950) was a Canadian football player and coach, who was the head coach of the Ottawa Rough Riders for 6 seasons (1937–1941, 1945). They appeared in 3 Grey Cups while Trimble was coach, winning 1. Trimble also had won 2 Grey Cups with the Toronto Balmy Beach Beachers in the 1920s and 1930s. He died suddenly on March 24, 1950 at the age of 42. It was less than a week after the death of his 4 year old daughter.

References

1908 births
1950 deaths
Ottawa Rough Riders coaches